Max Bennett may refer to:

 Max Bennett (actor) (born 1984), English actor
 Max Bennett (ice hockey) (1912–1972), Canadian ice hockey player 
 Max Bennett (musician) (1928–2018), American bassist 
 Max Bennett (scientist) (born 1939), Australian neuroscientist